Dan Dever (born February 7, 1946) is a former Canadian football player who played for the Ottawa Rough Riders and BC Lions. He won the Grey Cup in 1968, 1969 and 1973. He previously played college football at Wake Forest University.  Dever wore #30.

References

1946 births
Living people
Canadian football defensive backs
Canadian football linebackers
Ottawa Rough Riders players
BC Lions players
Wake Forest Demon Deacons football players
Canadian football people from Ottawa
Players of Canadian football from Ontario
Canadian players of American football